U-83 may refer to one of the following German submarines:

 , a Type U 81 submarine launched in 1916 and that served in the First World War until sunk on 17 February 1917
 During the First World War, Germany also had this submarine with a similar name:
 , a Type UB III submarine launched in 1917 and sunk on 10 September 1918
 , a Type VIIB submarine that served in the Second World War until sunk on 4 March 1943

Submarines of Germany